Lepidophyma radula,  the Yautepec tropical night lizard, is a species of lizard in the family Xantusiidae. It is a small lizard found in Mexico. It is known from only from two locations in the Valley of Oaxaca in central southern and central Oaxaca state – San Jose Manteca, five km from San Carlos Yautepec, and on the road between Mitla and Ayutla. It inhabits shrubland between 1,750 and 1,800 meters elevation.

References

Lepidophyma
Endemic reptiles of Mexico
Fauna of the Southern Pacific dry forests
Reptiles described in 1942
Taxa named by Hobart Muir Smith